George Eliot Academy (formerly The George Eliot School) is a mixed secondary school located in Nuneaton in the English county of Warwickshire.

The school was established in September 1961, and became a foundation school in September 2009 in partnership with North Warwickshire and Hinckley College. In September 2011 the school converted to academy status and is now part of the Midland Academies Trust.

The school is named after George Eliot, the pen name of Mary Ann Evans (1819 – 1880). Evans was novelist, journalist and translator who was born in Nuneaton, and is considered to be one of the leading writers of the Victorian era.

Notable former pupils
Laura Harvey, football coach and former player

References

External links
The George Eliot School official website

Secondary schools in Warwickshire
Educational institutions established in 1961
1961 establishments in England
Nuneaton
Academies in Warwickshire